Eristalis jugorum is a European species of hoverfly.

References

Diptera of Europe
Eristalinae
Insects described in 1858
Taxa named by Johann Egger